Javier Enrique Arape Quevedo (born 5 June 2001) is a Venezuelan footballer who plays for Academia Puerto Cabello in the Venezuelan Primera División.

Club career

Academia Puerto Cabello
A graduate of the Academia Puerto Cabello youth academy, Arape made his competitive debut for the club on 18 May 2018 in a 0–0 home draw with Zulia FC, coming on as a sub in the 55th minute for Luifer Hernández.

References

External links

2001 births
Living people
Venezuelan Primera División players
Venezuelan footballers
Association football forwards
Academia Puerto Cabello players
People from Puerto Cabello